Madison County High School (MCHS) is a public high school in unincorporated Madison County, Florida, west of Madison. It is a part of the Madison County Schools district.

References

External links

 Madison County High School

Public high schools in Florida
Education in Madison County, Florida